William Tobin (7 June 1859 – 17 January 1904) was an Australian cricketer. He played three first-class cricket matches for Victoria between 1880 and 1885. He toured New Zealand with the Australian team in 1880-81.

See also
 List of Victoria first-class cricketers

References

External links
 

1859 births
1904 deaths
Australian cricketers
Victoria cricketers
Sportspeople from Kensington
Cricketers from Greater London
Melbourne Cricket Club cricketers